The Chadronian age within the North American Land Mammal Ages chronology is the North American faunal stage typically set from 38,000,000 to 33,900,000 years BP, a period of  . It is usually considered to fall within the Eocene epoch. The Chadronian is preceded by the Duchesnean and followed by the Orellan NALMA stages.

The Chadronian can be further divided into the substages of:
Late/Upper Chadronian (shares upper boundary). Lower boundary source of the base of the Priabonian (approximate)
Middle Chadronian. Lower boundary source and base of the Priabonian (approximate). Upper boundary source of the base of the Orellan (approximate).
Early/Lower Chadronian (shares lower boundary). Upper boundary source: base of Orellan (approximate).

Geological time
The Chadronian maintains a period of time within the Priabonian through Rupelian of the Late Eocene through Early Oligocene in the geologic time scale.

References

 
Eocene life
Eocene animals of North America